Miomir is a Serbo-Croatian masculine given name of Slavic origin. It may refer to:

Miomir Mugoša (born 1955), Montenegrin politician
Miomir Vukobratović (1931–2012), Serbian inventor
Miomir Žužul (born 1955), Croatian politician
Miomir Kecmanović (born 1999), Serbian tennis player
Miomir Petrović, member of rock group Siluete

See also
Milomir

Slavic masculine given names
Serbian masculine given names